Otiorhynchus (sometimes misspelled as Otiorrhynchus) is a large genus of weevils in the family Curculionidae. Many species of the genus, particularly the black vine weevil (O. sulcatus) and the strawberry root weevil (O. ovatus), are important pests, both as larvae and as adults. Larvae feed on plant roots. Adults are flightless with fused elytra and feed at night on plant foliage. In many species of the genus at least some races are polyploid and parthenogenetic, while the rest of the races and species are diploid and bisexual. Otiorhynchus weevils, particularly O. scaber, have been a popular subject for studies of the evolution of parthenogenesis. The genus is native to the Palearctic region. However, sixteen species were inadvertently introduced to North America and have become widespread there.

A number of species are troglobites, cave-dwelling animals that lack eyes.

There are over 1,500 species in this genus, which is divided into at least 105 subgenera.

Species include:

Otiorhynchus alpicola
Otiorhynchus arcticus
Otiorhynchus cribricollis
Otiorhynchus cuneiformis
Otiorhynchus dieckmanni
Otiorhynchus frater
Otiorhynchus gemmatus
Otiorhynchus grischunensis
Otiorhynchus ligneus
Otiorhynchus ligustici
Otiorhynchus magnanoi
Otiorhynchus meridionalis
Otiorhynchus morio
Otiorhynchus ovatus
Otiorhynchus porcatus
Otiorhynchus rhacusensis
Otiorhynchus radjai
Otiorhynchus raucus
Otiorhynchus rugifrons
Otiorhynchus rugostriatus
Otiorhynchus scaber
Otiorhynchus singularis
Otiorhynchus sulcatus
Otiorhynchus vehemens

References

Further reading 
O'Brian, K. A touch of weevil. The Daily Telegraph 12 October 2002.

Entiminae